Helianthus atrorubens is a North American species of sunflower known by the common name purpledisc sunflower. It is native to the southeastern United States. It is found in all the coastal states from Louisiana to Virginia, plus the inland states of Kentucky and Tennessee.

Helianthus atrorubens is a perennial herb sometimes as much as 200 cm (80 inches) tall. Most of the leaves are close to the base of the stem. One plant can produce 1-15 flower heads, each with 10-15 yellow ray florets surrounding 75 or more red or purple disc florets. The plant grows in mixed woods and along roadsides.

References

External links
Alabama Plants, Helianthus atrorubens L. - Purple Disk Sunflower  photo
Alabama Plant Atlas

atrorubens
Flora of the Southeastern United States
Plants described in 1753
Taxa named by Carl Linnaeus